Khoarahlane Seutloali (born 30 March 1992) is a Lesotho long-distance runner. He qualified to represent Lesotho at the 2020 Summer Olympics in Tokyo 2021, competing in men's marathon.

References

External links
 

 

1992 births
Living people
Lesotho male long-distance runners
Athletes (track and field) at the 2020 Summer Olympics
Olympic athletes of Lesotho
Lesotho male marathon runners
Olympic male marathon runners